Roland Kenneth Harrison (4 August 1920 – 2 May 1993) was an Old Testament scholar.

Background and career
Harrison studied at the University of London (B.D., 1943; M.Th., 1947, Ph.D., 1952) and taught at Clifton College, Bristol from 1947 to 1949, before his appointment as Hellmuth Professor of Old Testament Studies at Huron College, University of Western Ontario. In 1960 he became Professor of Old Testament Studies at Wycliffe College, University of Toronto, where he stayed until his retirement in 1986.

Harrison is best known for his Introduction to the Old Testament (1969) but wrote many other books, including commentaries on Leviticus and Jeremiah and Lamentations. He was on the Executive Review Committee of the New King James Version. and translated several of the Minor Prophets in the New International Version. Together with Merrill Unger, he edited The New Unger’s Bible Dictionary.

In 1988, a Festschrift was published in his honour, Israel's apostasy and restoration: essays in honor of Roland K Harrison. Edited by Avraham Gileadi, it included contributions by Clarence Hassell Bullock, Eugene Merrill and Bruce Waltke.

Harrison married Kathleen Beattie in 1945, and they had three children.

Tremper Longman described him as "one of the most competent Old Testament evangelical scholars today."

Works

Books

Articles and chapters

Festschrift

See also
Olaf M. Norlie – whose Simplified New Testament was published along with Harrison's The Psalms for Today in the same binding

References

1920 births
1993 deaths
Alumni of the University of London
British evangelicals
British biblical scholars
Academic staff of the University of Western Ontario
Academic staff of the University of Toronto
Old Testament scholars
Translators of the Bible into English
20th-century translators
Bible commentators